The Great Adventures of Wild Bill Hickok (1938) is a Columbia Pictures movie serial.  It was the fourth of the 57 serials released by Columbia and the studio's first Western serial. The serial was the first to be produced by Columbia personnel; Columbia's previous three serials had been produced by the independent Weiss Brothers company, using Columbia's facilities.

Plot
Wild Bill Hickok, U.S. Marshal in Abilene, Kansas, is sent to stop the mysterious "Phantom Riders" from disrupting the cattle drives across the Chisholm Trail and construction of a new railroad.

Cast
Bill Elliott as Wild Bill Hickok, U.S. Marshal
Monte Blue as Mr. Cameron
Carole Wayne as Ruth Cameron
Frankie Darro as Jerry/Little Brave Heart
Dickie Jones as Buddy
Sammy McKim as Boots
Kermit Maynard as Kit Lawson, Army scout
Roscoe Ates as Oscar 'Snake-Eyes' Smith
Monte Collins as Danny, printer
Reed Hadley as Jim Blakely
Chief Thundercloud as Chief Gray Eagle
Ray Mala as Little Elk
Robert Fiske as Morrell, villain and leader of the Phantom Raiders
Walter Wills as Joshua Bruce
J.P. McGowan as Scudder, trail leader
Eddie Waller as Stone

Stunts
Gene Alsace
Chuck Hamilton
Ted Mapes
Carl Mathews
Kermit Maynard
Tom Steele
Francis Walker

Production
The serial was shot on location in Utah (Johnson Canyon, Three Lakes, and Parry Lodge). The production budget was an exceptional $200,000, this when the average western feature cost $10,000 to produce, and the film featured a great deal of elaborate outdoor scenes, including cattle drives and stampedes.

Reception
The Motion Picture Herald called this serial "a compliment to its title." It became a huge success in theaters, according to a tally published in Motion Picture Herald and Film Daily. The serial firmly established Columbia as a major serial producer, and Gordon Elliott as a western star. Elliott became so identified with the Wild Bill Hickok role that Columbia changed his name to Bill Elliott, and promoted him to feature films as a character named "Wild Bill Saunders" and then "Wild Bill Hickok." In addition to his screen name, he gained such trademarks as buckskins, reversed holsters and the catchphrase "I'm a peaceable man," from this serial.

Chapter titles
 The Law of the Gun
 Stampede
 Blazing Terror
 Mystery Canyon
 Flaming Brands
 The Apache Killer
 Prowling Wolves
 The Pit
 Ambush
 Savage Vengeance
 Burning Waters
 Desperation
 Phantom Bullets
 The Lure
 Trail's End

References

External links
 
 

1938 films
1938 Western (genre) films
American black-and-white films
American Western (genre) films
Cultural depictions of Wild Bill Hickok
Columbia Pictures film serials
1930s English-language films
Films directed by Mack V. Wright
Films shot in Utah
Films directed by Sam Nelson
Films with screenplays by Tom Gibson
1930s American films